Martinique (or ; Kalinago:  or ) is an island which is a single territorial collectivity of the French Republic. It is also part of the European Union as an Outermost Region within the Special territories of members of the European Economic Area, but is not part of the Schengen Area and the European Union Customs Union. As part of the French (Antilles) West Indies, Martinique is located in the Lesser Antilles of the West Indies in the eastern Caribbean Sea. One of the Windward Islands, it is directly north of Saint Lucia, northwest of Barbados and south of Dominica. Martinique is an Outermost Region and a special territory of the European Union; the currency in use is the euro. Virtually the entire population speaks both French (the sole official language) and Martinican Creole.

Etymology

History

Pre-European contact and early colonial periods
The island was occupied first by Arawaks, then by Caribs.  The Arawaks were described as gentle timorous Indians and the Caribs as ferocious cannibal warriors. The Arawaks came from Central America in the 1st century AD and the Caribs came from the Venezuelan coast around the 11th century.

Christopher Columbus charted Martinique (without landing) in 1493, during his first voyage, but Spain had little interest in the territory. Columbus landed during a later voyage, on 15 June 1502, after a 21-day trade wind passage, his fastest ocean voyage. He spent three days there refilling his water casks, bathing and washing laundry.

The indigenous people Columbus encountered called Martinique "Matinino". He was told by indigenous people of
San Salvador that "the island of Matinino was entirely populated by women on whom the Caribs descended at certain seasons of the year; and if these women bore sons they were entrusted to the father to bring up."

On 15 September 1635, Pierre Belain d'Esnambuc, French governor of the island of St. Kitts, landed in the harbour of St. Pierre with 80 to 150 French settlers after being driven off St. Kitts by the English. D'Esnambuc claimed Martinique for the French king Louis XIII and the French "Compagnie des Îles de l'Amérique" (Company of the American Islands), and established the first European settlement at Fort Saint-Pierre (now St. Pierre). D'Esnambuc died in 1636, leaving the company and Martinique in the hands of his nephew, Jacques Dyel du Parquet, who in 1637 became governor of the island.

In 1636, in the first of many skirmishes, the indigenous Caribs rose against the settlers to drive them off the island. The French successfully repelled the natives and forced them to retreat to the eastern part of the island, on the Caravelle Peninsula in the region then known as the Capesterre. When the Caribs revolted against French rule in 1658, the governor Charles Houël du Petit Pré retaliated with war against them. Many were killed, and those who survived were taken captive and expelled from the island. Some Caribs fled to Dominica or St. Vincent, where the French agreed to leave them at peace.

After the death of du Parquet in 1658, his widow Marie Bonnard du Parquet tried to govern Martinique, but dislike of her rule led King Louis XIV to take over the sovereignty of the island. In 1654, Dutch Jews expelled from Portuguese Brazil introduced sugar plantations worked by large numbers of enslaved Africans.

In 1667, the Second Anglo-Dutch War spilled out into the Caribbean, with Britain attacking the pro-Dutch French fleet in Martinique, virtually destroying it and further cementing British preeminence in the region. In 1674, the Dutch attempted to conquer the island, but were repulsed.

Because there were few Catholic priests in the French Antilles, many of the earliest French settlers were Huguenots who sought religious freedom. Others were transported there as a punishment for refusing to convert to Catholicism, many of them dying en route. Those who survived were quite industrious and over time prospered, though the less fortunate were reduced to the status of indentured servants. Although edicts from King Louis XIV's court regularly came to the islands to suppress the Protestant "heretics", these were mostly ignored by island authorities until Louis XIV's Edict of Revocation in 1685.

As many of the planters on Martinique were Huguenots suffering under the harsh strictures of the Revocation, they began plotting to emigrate from Martinique with many of their recently arrived brethren. Many of them were encouraged by the Catholics, who looked forward to their departure and the opportunities for seizing their property. By 1688, nearly all of Martinique's French Protestant population had escaped to the British American colonies or Protestant countries in Europe. The policy decimated the population of Martinique and the rest of the French Antilles and set back their colonisation by decades, causing the French king to relax his policies in the region, which left the islands susceptible to British occupation over the next century.

Post-1688 period
Under governor of the Antilles Charles de Courbon, comte de Blénac, Martinique served as a home port for French pirates, including Captain Crapeau, Étienne de Montauban, and Mathurin Desmarestz. In later years, pirate Bartholomew Roberts styled his jolly roger as a black flag depicting a pirate standing on two skulls labeled "ABH" and "AMH" for "A Barbadian's Head" and "A Martinican's Head" after governors of those two islands sent warships to capture Roberts.

Martinique was attacked or occupied several times by the British, in 1693, 1759, 1762 and 1779. Excepting a period from 1802 to 1809 following signing of the Treaty of Amiens, Britain controlled the island for most of the time from 1794 to 1815, when it was traded back to France at the conclusion of the Napoleonic Wars. Martinique has remained a French possession since then.

Despite the introduction of successful coffee plantations in the 1720s to Martinique, the first coffee-growing area in the Western hemisphere, as sugar prices declined in the early 1800s, the planter class lost political influence. Slave rebellions in 1789, 1815 and 1822, plus the campaigns of abolitionists such as Cyrille Bissette and Victor Schœlcher, persuaded the French government to end slavery in the French West Indies in 1848. Martinique was the first French overseas territory in which the abolition decree came into force, on 23 May of the same year.

As a result, some plantation owners imported workers from India and China. Despite the abolition of slavery, life scarcely improved for most Martinicans; class and racial tensions exploded into rioting in southern Martinique in 1870 following the arrest of Léopold Lubin, a trader of African ancestry who retaliated after he was beaten by a Frenchman. After several deaths, the revolt was crushed by French militia.

20th–21st centuries
On 8 May 1902, Mont Pelée erupted and completely destroyed St. Pierre, killing 30,000 people. Refugees from Martinique travelled by boat to the southern villages of Dominica, and some of them remained permanently on the island. The only survivor in the town of Saint-Pierre, Auguste Cyparis, was saved by the thick walls of his prison cell. Shortly thereafter, the capital shifted to Fort-de-France, where it remains today.

During World War II, the pro-Nazi Vichy government controlled Martinique under Admiral Georges Robert. German U-boats used Martinique for refuelling and re-supply during the Battle of the Caribbean. In 1942, 182 ships were sunk in the Caribbean, dropping to 45 in 1943, and five in 1944. Free French forces took over on the island on Bastille Day, 14 July 1943.

In 1946, the French National Assembly voted unanimously to transform the colony into an Overseas Department of France. Meanwhile, the post-war period saw a growing campaign for full independence; a notable proponent of this was the author Aimé Césaire, who founded the Progressive Party of Martinique in the 1950s. Tensions boiled over in December 1959 when riots broke out following a racially-charged altercation between two motorists, resulting in three deaths. In 1962, as a result of this and the global turn against colonialism, the strongly pro-independence OJAM was formed. Its leaders were later arrested by the French authorities. However, they were later acquitted. Tensions rose again in 1974, when gendarmes shot dead two striking banana workers. However the independence movement lost steam as Martinique's economy faltered in the 1970s, resulting in large-scale emigration. Hurricanes in 1979–80 severely affected agricultural output, further straining the economy. Greater autonomy was granted by France to the island in the 1970s–80s

In 2009, Martinique was convulsed by the French Caribbean general strikes. Initially focusing on cost-of-living issues, the movement soon took on a racial dimension as strikers challenged the continued economic dominance of the Béké, descendants of French European settlers. President Nicolas Sarkozy later visited the island, promising reform. While ruling out full independence, which he said was desired neither by France nor by Martinique, Sarkozy offered Martiniquans a referendum on the island's future status and degree of autonomy.

On 2 February 2023, Martinique adopted its independent activist flag, symbolising its three colors of Pan-Africanism.

Governance

Like French Guiana, Martinique is a special collectivity (Unique in French) of the French Republic. It is also an outermost region of the European Union. The inhabitants of Martinique are French citizens with full political and legal rights. Martinique sends four deputies to the French National Assembly and two senators to the French Senate.

On 24 January 2010, during a referendum, the inhabitants of Martinique approved by 68.4% the change to be a "special (unique) collectivity" within the framework of article 73 of the French Republic's Constitution. The new council replaces and exercises the powers of both the General Council and the regional council.

Administrative divisions

Martinique is divided into four arrondissements and 34 communes. It had also been divided into 45 cantons, but these were abolished in 2015. The four arrondissements of the island, with their respective locations, are as follows:
 Fort-de-France, is the prefecture of Martinique. It takes up the central zone of the island. It includes four communes. In 2019, the population was 152,102. Besides the capital, it includes the communities of Saint-Joseph and Schœlcher.
 La Trinité, one of the three subprefectures on the island, occupies the northeast region. It has ten communes. In 2019, the population was 75,238. La Trinité contains the communities of La Trinité, Ajoupa-Bouillon, Basse-Pointe, Le Gros-Morne, Le Lorrain, Macouba, Le Marigot, Le Robert and Sainte-Marie.
 Le Marin, the second subprefecture of Martinique, makes up the southern part of the island and is composed of twelve communes. In 2019, the population was 114,824. The subprefecture includes the communities of La Marin, Les Anses d'Arlet, Le Diamant, Ducos, Le François, Rivière-Pilote, Rivière-Salée, Sainte-Anne, Sainte-Luce, Saint-Esprit, Les Trois-Îlets, and Le Vauclin.
 Saint-Pierre, is the third subprefecture of the island. It comprises eight communes, lying in the northwest of Martinique. In 2019, the population was 22,344. Together with Saint-Pierre, its communities include Le Carbet, Case-Pilote-Bellefontaine, Le Morne-Rouge, and Le Prêcheur.

Representation of the State 
The prefecture of Martinique is Fort-de-France. The three sub-prefectures are Le Marin, Saint-Pierre and La Trinité. The French State is represented in Martinique by a prefect (Stanislas Cazelles since 5 February 2020), and by two sub-prefects in Le Marin (Corinne Blanchot-Prosper) and La Trinité / Saint-Pierre (Nicolas Onimus, appointed on 20 May 2020).

The prefecture was criticized for racism following the publication on its Twitter account of a poster calling for physical distancing against the coronavirus and showing a black man and a white man separated by pineapples.

Institutions 

The President of the Executive Council of Martinique is Serge Letchimy as of 2 July 2021.

The Executive Council of Martinique is composed of nine members (a president and eight executive councilors).

The deliberative assembly of the territorial collectivity is the Assembly of Martinique, composed of 51 elected members and chaired by Lucien Saliber as of 2 July 2021.

The advisory council of the territorial collectivity of Martinique is the Economic, Social, Environmental, Cultural and Educational Council of Martinique (Conseil économique, social, environnemental, de la culture et de l'éducation de Martinique), composed of 68 members. Its president is Justin Daniel since 20 May 2021.

National representation 
Martinique has been represented since 17 June 2017, in the National Assembly by four deputies (Serge Letchimy, Jean-Philippe Nilor, Josette Manin and Manuéla Kéclard-Mondésir) and in the Senate by two senators (Maurice Antiste and Catherine Conconne) since 24 September 2017.

Martinique is also represented in the Economic, Social and Environmental Council by Pierre Marie-Joseph since 26 April 2021

Institutional and statutory evolution of the island 
During the 2000s, the political debate in Martinique focused on the question of the evolution of the island's status. Two political ideologies, assimilationism and autonomism, clashed. On the one hand, there are those who want a change of status based on Article 73 of the French Constitution, i.e., that all French laws apply in Martinique as of right, which in law is called legislative identity, and on the other hand, the autonomists who want a change of status based on Article 74 of the French Constitution, i.e., an autonomous status subject to the regime of legislative specialty following the example of St. Martin and St. Barthelemy.

Since the constitutional revision of 28 March 2003, Martinique has four options:
 First possibility: the status quo, Martinique retains its status as an Overseas Department and Region, under Article 73 of the Constitution. The DROMs are under the regime of legislative identity. In this framework, the laws and regulations are applicable as of right, with the adaptations required by the particular characteristics and constraints of the communities concerned.
 Second possibility: if the local stakeholders, and first and foremost the elected representatives, agree, they can, within the framework of Article 73 of the Constitution, propose an institutional evolution such as the creation of a single assembly (merger of the general council and the regional council). However, the department and the region will remain. The government may propose to the President of the Republic to consult the voters on this issue. In case of a negative answer, nothing will be possible. In case of positive response, the final decision will be taken by the Parliament, which will finally decide whether the reform is carried out by passing an ordinary law.
 Third possibility: those elected may propose the creation of a new collectivity within the framework of Article 73 of the French Constitution. This new community will replace the department and the region. It will bring together the competences currently attributed to the General Council and the Regional Council. This community governed by Article 73 is subject to the regime of legislative identity and is therefore not autonomous. It will have as institutions an executive council, a deliberative assembly and an economic and social council.
 Fourth possibility: if a consensus is reached, the elected representatives may propose to the government a change of status, i.e., the transformation of Martinique into an overseas collectivity (COM). Indeed, since the constitutional revision of 28 March 2003, the overseas departments may, under Article 74, become an overseas collectivity (COM) like St. Martin and St. Barthélemy.

Unlike the overseas departments, the overseas collectivities are subject to legislative specialization. The laws and decrees of the Republic apply to them under certain conditions established by the organic law defining their status. The overseas departments have a greater degree of autonomy than the DOMs. They have an executive council, a territorial council and an economic and social council. The prefect is the representative of the French State in the overseas collectivity.

However, the French Constitution specifies in Article 72-4 that "no change may be made, for all or part of one of the communities mentioned in the second paragraph of Article 72-3, from one of the regimes provided for in Articles 73 and 74, without the prior consent of the electors of the community or part of the community concerned having been obtained, under the conditions provided for in the following paragraph.

In 2003, a new organization is envisaged, in which the regional and departmental institutions would be merged into a single institution. This proposal was rejected in Martinique (but also in Guadeloupe) by 50.48% in a referendum held on 7 December 2003.

On 10 January 2010, a consultation of the population was held. Voters were asked to vote in a referendum on a possible change in the status of their territory. The ballot proposed voters to "approve or reject the transition to the regime provided for in Article 74 of the Constitution". The majority of voters, 79.3%, said "no".

The following 24 January, in a second referendum, 68.4% of the population of Martinique approved the transition to a "single collectivity" under Article 73 of the Constitution, i.e., a single assembly that would exercise the powers of the General Council and the Regional Council.

New collectivity of Martinique 
The project of the elected representatives of Martinique to the government proposes a single territorial community governed by Article 73 of the Constitution, whose name is "Territorial Community of Martinique". The single assembly that replaces the General Council and the Regional Council is called the "Assembly of Martinique". The Assembly of Martinique is composed of 51 councilors, elected for a six-year term of office by the proportional representation system (the electoral district is divided into four sections). A majority bonus of 20% is granted to the first place list.

The executive body of this community is called the "executive council", which is composed of nine executive councilors, including a president. The president of the community of Martinique is the president of the executive council. The executive council is responsible to the Assembly of Martinique, which may overrule it by a motion of constructive censure. Unlike the previous functioning of the General Council and the Regional Council, the Assembly of Martinique is separate from the Executive Council and is headed by a bureau and a president.

The new collectivity of Martinique combines the powers of the general and regional councils, but may obtain new powers through empowerments under Article 73. The executive council is assisted by an advisory council, the Economic, Social, Environmental, Cultural and Educational Council of Martinique.

The bill was approved on 26 January 2011, by the French Government. The ordinary law was submitted to Parliament during the first half of 2011 and resulted in the adoption of Law No. 2011-884 27 July 2011, on the territorial communities of French Guiana and Martinique.

Political forces 
Political life in Martinique is essentially based on Martinican political parties and local federations of national parties (PS and LR). The following classification takes into account their position with regard to the statutory evolution of the island: there are the assimilationists (in favor of an institutional or statutory evolution within the framework of Article 73 of the French Constitution), the autonomists and the independentists (in favor of a statutory evolution based on Article 74 of the French Constitution).

Indeed, on 18 December 2008, during the congress of Martinique's departmental and regional elected representatives, the thirty-three pro-independence elected representatives (MIM/CNCP/MODEMAS/PALIMA) of the two assemblies voted unanimously in favor of a change in the island's status based on Article 74 of the French Constitution, which allows access to autonomy; this change in status was massively rejected (79.3%) by the population during the referendum of 10 January 2010.

Defence 
The defence of the department is the responsibility of the French Armed Forces. Some 1,400 military personnel are deployed in Martinique and Guadeloupe – centred on the 33e régiment d'infanterie de Marine in Martinique and incorporating a reserve company of the regiment located in Guadeloupe.

The naval aviation element includes Eurocopter AS565 Panther and Eurocopter AS365 Dauphin helicopters able to embark on the Floréal-class frigates as required. One Engins de Débarquement Amphibie – Standards (EDA-S) landing craft is to be delivered to naval forces based in Martinique by 2025. The landing craft is to better support operations in the territory and region.

About 700 National Gendarmerie are also stationed in Martinique.

Geography

It is north of St. Lucia, northwest of Barbados and south of Dominica.

Martinique is the 3rd largest island in The Lesser Antilles after Trinidad and Guadeloupe. There are numerous small islands, particularly off the east coast.The Atlantic, or "windward" coast of Martinique is difficult to navigate by ship. A combination of coastal cliffs, shallow coral reefs and cays, and strong winds make the area notoriously hazardous for sea traffic. The Caravelle peninsula clearly separates the north Atlantic and south Atlantic coast.
The Caribbean, or "leeward" coast of Martinique is much more favourable to sea traffic. Besides being shielded from the harsh Atlantic trade winds by the island, the sea bed itself descends steeply from the shore. This ensures that most potential hazards are deep underwater, and prevents the growth of corals.

The north of the island is especially mountainous. Mont Pelée's volcanic ash has created grey and black sand beaches in the north (in particular between Anse Ceron and Anse des Gallets), contrasting markedly from the white sands of Les Salines in the south.

The south is more easily traversed, though it still features impressive geographic features. Because it is easier to travel to, and due to the many beaches and food facilities throughout this region, the south receives most of the tourism. The beaches from Pointe de Bout, through Diamant (which features right off the coast of Roche de Diamant), St. Luce, the department of St. Anne and down to Les Salines are popular.

Relief 
The terrain is mountainous on this island of volcanic origin. The oldest areas correspond to the volcanic zones at the southern end of the island and towards the peninsula of La Caravelle to the east. The island developed over the last 20 million years according to a sequence of movements and volcanic eruptions to the north.

The volcanic activity is due to the subduction fault located here, where the South American Plate slides beneath the Caribbean Plate. Martinique has eight centres of volcanic activity. The oldest rocks are andesitic lavas dated to about 24 million years ago, mixed with tholeiitic magma containing iron and magnesium. Mount Pelée, the island's most dramatic feature, formed about 400,000 years ago. Pelée erupted in 1792, 1851, and twice in 1902. The eruption of 8 May 1902, destroyed Saint-Pierre and killed 28,000 people in 2 minutes; that of 30 August 1902, killed nearly 1,100, mostly in Le Morne-Rouge and Ajoupa-Bouillon.

The east coast, coast of the wind or of the islands, has been called in the Caribbean "cabesterre". This term in Martinique designates more specifically the area of La Caravelle. This windward coast, bordered by the Atlantic Ocean, is directly exposed to the trade winds and the sea bottom. The northern part of the Grand River in Sainte-Marie is basically surrounded by cliffs, with very few mooring points; access to maritime navigation is limited to inshore fishing with small traditional Martinique boats.

Flora and fauna

The northern end of the island catches most of the rainfall and is heavily forested, featuring species such as bamboo, mahogany, rosewood and West Indian locust. The south is drier and dominated by savanna-like brush, including cacti, Copaiba balsam, logwood and acacia.

Anole lizards and fer-de-lance snakes are native to the island. Mongooses (Urva auropunctata), introduced in the 1800s to control the snake population, have become a particularly cumbersome introduced species as they prey upon bird eggs and have exterminated or endangered a number of native birds, including the Martinique trembler, white-breasted trembler and White-breasted Thrasher. Bat species include the Jamaican fruit bat, the Antillean fruit-eating bat, the Little yellow-shouldered bat, Davy's naked-backed bat, the Greater bulldog bat, Schwartz's myotis, and the Mexican free-tailed bat.

Beaches 
Martinique has many beaches: those in the south of the island are of white sand, unlike those in the north which are of volcanic origin and therefore of black or gray sand.

Most of the beaches are wild, without services and without surveillance, but some are organized and give the possibility to do sports and activities related to the sea.

Hydrography 
Due to the island's geographic and morphological characteristics, it has short and torrential rivers. The Lézarde, 30 km long, is the longest on the island.

Major urban areas 

The most populous urban unit is Le Robert, which covers 11 communes in the southeastern part of the department. The three largest urban units are:

Economy

In 2014, Martinique had a total GDP of 8.4 billion euros. Its economy is heavily dependent on tourism, limited agricultural production, and grant aid from mainland France.

Historically, Martinique's economy relied on agriculture, notably sugar and bananas, but by the beginning of the 21st century this sector had dwindled considerably. Sugar production has declined, with most of the sugarcane now used for the production of rum. Banana exports are increasing, going mostly to mainland France. Chlordecone, a pesticide used in the cultivation of bananas before a ban in 1993, has been found to have contaminated farming ground, rivers and fish, and affected the health of islanders. Fishing and agriculture has had to stop in affected areas, having a significant effect on the economy. The bulk of meat, vegetable and grain requirements must be imported. This contributes to a chronic trade deficit that requires large annual transfers of aid from mainland France.

All goods entering Martinique are charged a variable "sea toll" which may reach 30% of the value of the cargo and provides 40% of the island's total revenue. Additionally the government charges an "annual due" of 1–2.5% and a value added tax of 2.2–8.5%.

Exports and imports 
Exports of goods and services in 2015 amounted to €1,102 million (€504 million of goods), of which more than 20% were refined petroleum products (SARA refinery located in the town of Le Lamentin), €95.9 million of agricultural, forestry, fish and aquaculture products, €62.4 million of agri-food industry products and €54.8 million of other goods.

Imports of goods and services in 2015 were €3,038 million (of which €2,709 million were goods), of which approximately 40% were crude and refined petroleum products, €462.6 million were agricultural and agri-food products, and €442.8 million were mechanical, electrical, electronic and computer equipment.

Tourism

Tourism has become more important than agricultural exports as a source of foreign exchange. Most visitors come from mainland France, Canada and the US. Roughly 16% of the total businesses on the island (some 6,000 companies) provide tourist-related services.

Agriculture

Banana 
Banana cultivation is the main agricultural activity, with more than 7,200 hectares cultivated, nearly 220,000 tons produced and almost 12,000 jobs (direct + indirect) in 2006 figures. Its weight in the island's economy is low (1.6%), however it generates more than 40% of the agricultural value added.

Rum 
Rum, and particularly agricultural rum, accounted for 23% of agri-food value added in 2005 and employed 380 people on the island (including traditional rum). The island's production is about 90,000 hl of pure alcohol in 2009, of which 79,116 hl of pure alcohol is agricultural rum (2009).

Sugarcane 
In 2009, sugarcane cultivation occupied 4,150 hectares, or 13.7% of agricultural land. The area under cultivation has increased by more than 20% in the last 20 years, a rapid increase explained by the high added value of the rum produced and the rise in world sugar prices. This production is increasingly concentrated, with farms of more than 50 hectares accounting for 6.2% of the farms and 73.4% of the area under production. Annual production was about 220,000 tons in 2009, of which almost 90,000 tons went to sugar production, and the rest was delivered to agricultural rum distilleries.

Pineapples 
Pineapples used to be an important part of agricultural production, but in 2005, according to IEDOM, they accounted for only 1% of agricultural production in value (2.5 million euros compared to 7.9 million in 2000).

Infrastructure

Transport
Martinique's main and only airport with commercial flights is Martinique Aimé Césaire International Airport. It serves flights to and from Europe, the Caribbean, Venezuela, the United States, and Canada. See List of airports in Martinique.

Fort-de-France is the major harbour. The island has regular ferry service to Guadeloupe, Dominica and St. Lucia. There are also several local ferry companies that connect Fort-de-France with Pointe du Bout.

The road network is extensive and well-maintained, with freeways in the area around Fort-de-France. Buses run frequently between the capital and St. Pierre.

Roads 
In 2019, Martinique's road network consisted of 2,123 km:
 7 km of highway (A1 between Fort-de-France and Le Lamentin) ;
 919 km of departmental and national roads
 1,197 km of communal roads.

In proportion to its population, Martinique is the French department with the highest number of vehicle registrations.

In 2019, 19,137 new vehicles were registered in Martinique, i.e. 42 new vehicles were purchased per 1,000 inhabitants (+14 in 5 years), to the great benefit of dealers.

Public transport 
The public entity "Martinique Transport" was created in December 2014. This establishment is in charge of urban, intercity passenger (cabs), maritime, school and disabled student transport throughout the island, as well as the bus network.

The first exclusive right-of-way public transport line in Martinique (TCSP), served by high service level buses between Fort-de-France and Le Lamentin airport, was put into service on 13 August 2018. Extensions to Schœlcher, Robert and Ducos are planned.

Ports 
Given the insular nature of Martinique, its supply by sea is important. The port of Fort-de-France is the seventh largest French port in terms of container traffic. After 2012, it became the Grand Port Maritime Port (GPM) of Martinique, following the State's decision to modernize port infrastructures of national interest.

Air services 
The island's airport is Martinique Aimé Césaire International Airport. It is located in the municipality of Le Lamentin. Its civilian traffic (1,696,071 passengers in 2015) ranks it thirteenth among French airports, behind those of two other overseas departments (Guadeloupe – Pôle Caraïbes de Pointe-à-Pitre Airport, Guadeloupe, and La Réunion-Roland-Garros Airport). Its traffic is very strongly polarized by metropolitan France, with very limited (192,244 passengers in 2017) and declining international traffic.

Railroads 
At the beginning of the 20th century, Martinique had more than 240 km of railways serving the sugar factories (cane transport). Only one tourist train remains in Sainte-Marie between the Saint-James house and the banana museum.

Communications
The country code top-level domain for Martinique is .mq, but .fr is often used instead. The country code for international dialling is 596.  The entire island uses a single area code (also 596) for landline phones and 696 for cell phones.  (596 is dialled twice when calling a Martinique landline from another country.)

Mobile telephony 
There are three mobile telephone networks in Martinique: Orange, SFR Caraïbe and Digicel. The arrival of Free, in partnership with Digicel, was planned for 2020.45

According to Arcep, by mid-2018, Martinique is 99% covered by 4G.

Television 
The DTT package includes 10 free channels: 4 national channels of the France Télévisions group, the news channel France 24, Arte and 4 local channels Martinique 1re, ViàATV, KMT Télévision. Zouk TV stopped broadcasting in April 2021 and will be subsequently replaced by Zitata TV, whose broadcasting is delayed following the COVID-19 pandemic.

Viewers in Martinique do not have free access to other free national channels in the DTT package in mainland France (TF1 group, M6 group, etc.).

Viewers in the French overseas territories also do not have free access to the public service cultural channel Culturebox, which is not broadcast locally on DTT.

The French-language satellite package Canal+ Caraïbes is available in the territory.

Telephone and Internet 
In early 2019, Orange put into service "Kanawa", a new submarine cable linking Martinique to French Guiana.

Martinique is also connected by other submarine cables: ECFS (en), Americas-2 (en) and Southern Caribbean Fiber.

Demographics

Population

Martinique had a population of 364,508 as of January 2019. The population has been decreasing by 0.9% per year since 2013. There are an estimated 260,000 people of Martinican origin living in mainland France, most of them in the Paris region. Emigration was highest in the 1970s, causing population growth to almost stop, but it is comparatively light today.

Ethnic groups
The population of Martinique is mainly of African descent generally mixed with European, Amerindian (Carib), Indian (descendants of 19th-century Tamil and Telugu immigrants from South India), Lebanese, Syrian or Chinese. Martinique also has a small Syro-Lebanese community, a small Indian community, a small but increasing Chinese community, and the Béké community, descendants of the first European settlers.

The Béké population represents around 1% of Martinique's population, mostly of noble ancestry or members of the old bourgeoisie. In addition to the island population, the island hosts a mainland French community, most of which live on the island on a temporary basis (generally from 3 to 5 years).

Religion

About 90% of Martiniquans are Christian, predominantly Roman Catholic as well as smaller numbers of various Protestant denominations. There are much smaller communities of other faiths such as Islam, Hinduism and the Baháʼí Faith.

The island has 49 parishes and several historic places of worship, such as the Saint-Louis Cathedral of Fort de France, the Sacred Heart Church of Balata, and the Co-Cathedral of Our Lady of Assumption, Saint-Pierre.

Catholic Church 
Catholic Christians follow the Latin rite, with parishes in each municipality and village of the territory. The island has the following places of worship classified as historic monuments:
 Saint-Louis Cathedral (Cathédrale Saint Louis) in Fort-de-France, erected in 1850 by a bull of Pope Pius IX, is currently the seat of the archdiocese of Saint-Pierre and Fort-de-France since 1967.
 Church of the Sacré-coeur (Sacred Heart) in Balata
 Cathedral of Notre-Dame-de-l'Assomption (Cathedral of Our Lady of the Assumption) in Saint-Pierre de la Martinique. The former church of Mouillage, located on the corner of Victor Hugo Street and Dupuy Street, in the Mouillage district of Saint-Pierre, was completed in 1956.
 Our Lady of the Assumption Church, in Sainte-Marie, a town in Martinique, dates to 1658.

The Archdiocese of Saint-Pierre and Fort-de-France (Latin: archidioecesis Sancti Petri et Arcis Gallicae seu Martinicensis) is an ecclesiastical circumscription of the Catholic Church in the Caribbean, based in Saint-Pierre and Fort-de-France, on the island of Martinique. The archdiocese of Saint-Pierre and Fort-de-France is metropolitan and its suffragan dioceses are Basse-Terre and Pointe-à-Pitre and Cayenne.

Languages

The official language of Martinique is French, which is spoken by most of the population. The department was integrated into France in 1946, and consequently became French. Most residents also speak Martinican Creole (Martinique Creole, Kréyol Mat'nik, Kreyòl), a form of Antillean Creole closely related to the varieties spoken in neighboring English-dominated islands of Saint Lucia and Dominica. Martiniquan Creole is based on French, Carib and African languages with elements of English, Spanish, and Portuguese. Also, unlike other varieties of French creole, such as Mauritian Creole, Martinican Creole is not readily understood by speakers of Standard French due to significant differences in grammar, syntax, vocabulary and pronunciation. It continues to be used in oral storytelling traditions and other forms of speech and to a lesser extent in writing.

French and Creole are in a diglossic situation in Martinique, where French is used in official dialogue and Martinican Creole is used in casual or familial contexts. Creole was a spoken language with a developed "oraliture"; it wasn't until the mid 20th century that Martinican Creole began to be written. Since then, decreolization of the language has taken place via the adoption of Standard French features, mostly unconsciously, but some speakers have noticed that they do not speak Creole like their parents once did.

Being an overseas department of France, the island has European, French, Caribbean, Martinican, black and Creole markers of identity, all being influenced by foreign factors, social factors, cultural factors and, as a reportedly important marker, linguistic practices. Martinican and Creole identities are specifically asserted through encouragement of Creole and its use in literature, in a movement known as Créolité, that was started by Patrick Chamoiseau, Jean Bernabé and Raphaël Confiant. Martinican Creole used to be a shameful language, and it wasn't until the 1970s that it has been revalorized through literature and increasing code switching. People now speak Martinican Creole more often and in more contexts.

Speaking Creole in public schools was forbidden until 1982, which is thought to have discouraged parents from using Creole in the home. In collaboration with GEREC (Groupe d'Etudes et de Recherches en Espace Créolophone) Raphaël Confiant created KAPES KREYOL (CAPES for Creole, Certificat d'aptitude au professorat de l'enseignement du second degré),  which is an aptitude exam that allowed Creole teachers in secondary school. This debuted 9 February 2001. Recently, the education authority, Académie de la Martinique, launched "Parcours Creole +" in 2019, a project trialling bilingual education of children in French and Martinican Creole. Rather than being a topic to be learned itself, Creole became a language that classes were taught in, such as arts, math, physical activity, etc.

Though Creole is normally not used in professional situations, members of the media and politicians have begun to use it more frequently as a way to redeem national identity and prevent cultural assimilation by mainland France.

Linguistic features of Martinican Creole 
Martinican Creole has general locative marking (GLM, also called general locative adposition, goal/source (in)difference and motion-to=motion-from). This means that source locations, final locations and static entity locations are expressed morphologically identically. Some West African languages that are possibly contributors to Martinican Creole also present GLM. Martinican Creole locative marking exists in 3 morphological types, including:

 spatial prepositions as free morphemes;
 These include "an" (in), "adan" (inside), "douvan" (in front), "anba" (under) and "anlè" (on).
 spatial morphemes "a-", "an(n)-", and "o(z)-" bound to the noun on their right;
 Only bare lexemes that depict certain locations will take on these particles
 phonologically null locative markers
 In ambiguous sentences, these are added to polysyllabic city names

Culture

As an overseas département of France, Martinique's culture blends French and Caribbean influences. The city of Saint-Pierre (destroyed by a volcanic eruption of Mount Pelée), was often referred to as the "Paris of the Lesser Antilles". Following traditional French custom, many businesses close at midday to allow a lengthy lunch, then reopen later in the afternoon.

Today, Martinique has a higher standard of living than most other Caribbean countries. French products are easily available, from Chanel fashions to Limoges porcelain. Studying in the métropole (mainland France, especially Paris) is common for young adults. Martinique has been a vacation hotspot for many years, attracting both upper-class French and more budget-conscious travelers.

Cuisine
Martinique has a hybrid cuisine, mixing elements of African, French, Carib Amerindian and Indian subcontinental traditions. One of its most famous dishes is the Colombo (compare kuzhambu for gravy or broth), a unique curry of chicken (curry chicken), meat or fish with vegetables, spiced with a distinctive masala of Tamil origins, sparked with tamarind, and often containing wine, coconut milk, cassava and rum. A strong tradition of Martiniquan desserts includes cakes made with pineapple, rum, and a wide range of local ingredients.

Literature

Sisters Jeanne Nardal and Paulette Nardal were involved in the creation of the Négritude movement. Yva Léro was a writer and painter who co-founded the Women's Union of Martinique. Marie-Magdeleine Carbet wrote with her partner under the pseudonym Carbet.

Aimé Césaire is perhaps Martinique's most famous writer; he was one of the main figures in the Négritude literary movement. René Ménil was a surrealist writer who founded the journal Tropiques with Aimé and Suzanne Césaire and later formulated the concept of Antillanité. Other surrealist writers of that era included Étienne Léro and Jules Monnerot, who co-founded the journal Légitime Défense with Simone Yoyotte and Ménil. Édouard Glissant was later influenced by Césaire and Ménil, and in turn had an influence on Patrick Chamoiseau, who founded the Créolité movement with Raphaël Confiant and Jean Bernabé. Raphaël Confiant was a poetry, prose and non-fiction writer who supports Creole and tries to bring both French and Creole (Martinican and Guadeloupean) together in his work. He is specifically known for his contribution to the Créolité movement.

Frantz Fanon, a prominent critic of colonialism and racism, was also from Martinique.

Music

Martinique has a large popular music industry, which gained in international renown after the success of zouk music in the later 20th century. Zouk's popularity was particularly intense in France, where the genre became an important symbol of identity for Martinique and Guadeloupe. Zouk's origins are in the folk music of Martinique and Guadeloupe, especially Martinican chouval bwa, and Guadeloupan gwo ka. There's also notable influence of the pan-Caribbean calypso tradition and Haitian kompa.

Symbols and flags 

As a part of the French Republic, the French tricolour is in use and La Marseillaise is sung at national French events. When representing Martinique outside of the island for sport and cultural events the civil flag is 'Ipséité' and the anthem is 'Lorizon'. Martinique's civil ensign is the cross of St Michael (white cross with four blue quarters with one snake in each), which is the official civil ensign of Martinique (it also used to be the civil ensign of Saint Lucia). A coat of arms adaptation of the civil ensign (also called the "snake flag") was used in an unofficial but formal context such as by the Gendarmerie until 2018. Pro-independence activists also have their own flag, using red, black and green.

Sport

Association football 
The Martinique national football team is affiliated with CONCACAF, but not FIFA, so it does not play in World Cup Qualifiers, but can play friendly matches and CONCACAF tournaments such as the CONCACAF Nations League and Gold Cup. Since Martiniquais people are French citizens, they may choose to represent France in international competitions. Several French players also have had roots in Martinique although they were born or raised in France. Among the most famous include Thierry Henry, Eric Abidal, Raphaël Varane, Sylvain Wiltord and Loïc Rémy, all of whom represented France on multiple occasions and in Henry's case won the European Golden Boot twice. Henry and Varane also have won a FIFA World Cup each.

Martinique has its own soccer league known as the Ligue de Football de Martinique. The Martinique men's soccer championship, known as the Regional 1 (R1) – Trophée Gérard Janvion, is a premier local soccer competition in the territory. It is held annually in the form of a championship between fourteen amateur clubs between the months of September and May. The competition is organized by the Martinique Football League and, although the clubs in the league are affiliated with the French Football Federation, there is no promotion to the French national championships.

At the end of the twenty-six-day (two-stage) championship, the top four teams qualify for the Ligue Antilles, while the bottom three are relegated to the lower division, the Régionale 2.

Surf 

The Martinique Surf Pro is an international surfing competition held every year in April in Basse-Pointe (Martinique). It was created in 2015 by two Martinicans, Nicolas Ursulet and Nicolas Clémenté and is organized by the Caribbean Surf Project (CSP).51 It is the only Caribbean competition in the World Surf League, the world surfing championship. It is part of the World Qualifying Series calendar, the entry league to the WSL's elite circuit, the Championship Tour.

Regattas 
Le Tour de Yoles Rondes de Martinique is an annual sailing regatta, the island's largest sporting event, which takes place in late July and early August and is very popular with spectators.

The event is organized by the Fédération des yoles rondes. Crews circumnavigate Martinique on a 180-kilometer course over eight stages. The race begins with a prologue time trial from the starting town.

The time trial determines the starting order of the first ten boats, and the time between starts is determined by the advantage of each boat over the next during the prologue; all Boats below the top ten start simultaneously. The next seven legs circumnavigate the island. The leg around the southern part of the island, starting in the commune of Le Diamant, passing through Sainte-Anne and finishing in Le François, is known as the Défi de l'Espace Sud (Southern Challenge Zone).

Handball 
The Martinique Handball Championship, organized by the Martinique Handball League, concludes with the Poule des As (play-off) which determines the Martinique champion in the women's and men's categories. The Poule des As is a very popular event in Martinique, the pavilions are filled for the finals held at the Palais des Sports de Lamentin.

The highest division is the Pré-Nationale, equivalent to the Pré-Nationale (or even the Nationale 3) in metropolitan France. The champions of the Poule des As come every year to Metropolitan France to play in the finals of the French Handball Championships of N1, N2 and N3 Women, N2 and N3 Men Metropolitan/Ultra Marines.

The winners (female and male) of the Martinique Handball Cup, receive a reward of 10 000 Euros. The main players of the Martinique Handball Championship in recent years have been: Katty Piejos, Cédric Sorhaindo, Joël Abati.

Notable Martinique people 
Below is a list of notable people born in Martinique, with at least one parent or grandparent born in Martinique, or who are living or have lived in Martinique.

Painters and sculptors 
 Victor Anicet
 Jean-François Boclé
 Hector Charpentier
 Henri Guédon
 René Louise
 Joseph René-Corail, also known as Khokho

Film-makers, screenwriters, directors and actors 

 Lucien Jean-Baptiste
 Alex Descas
 Viktor Lazlo
 Darling Légitimus
 Chris Macari
 Euzhan Palcy
 Stéfi Celma
 Cathy Rosier

Singers, musicians or music groups 

 Paulo Albin : author, composer and performer, lead singer in La Perfecta
 Jenny Alpha : actress and singer
 Jocelyne Béroard : author and part of the group Kassav' and first woman to receive a double gold record for the sales of her album Siwo in the Antilles. She was made Officer of l'ordre des Arts et des Lettres in 2020 and National Order of the Legion of Honor in 2014.
 Mino Cinelu : musician
 Cyril Cinélu : winner of Star Académy 2006
 Miss Dominique : singer
 Gibson Brothers : a disco/salsa band from Sainte-Marie
 Christina Goh : singer and songwriter of blues-chanson réaliste music
 JoeyStarr : rapper, producer and actor
 Simon Jurad : author, composer, performer (former guitarist of La Perfecta)
 Lord Kossity : rapper and dancehall singer. In 1998, he recorded the hit Ma Benz with Kool Shen and JoeyStarr on Suprême NTM's album, which made him a household name in France.
 Philippe Lavil : singer, author, composer and performer
 Kalash : rapper - his hit "Mwaka Moon" featuring rapper Damso has more than 200 million views on YouTube.
 Tiitof : rapper and trap music artist.
 Viktor Lazlo : actress and singer
 Princess Lover : zouk singer
 Malavoi : band mixing French Antillean music with modern influences from across the Americas
 Edmond Mondésir : author, composer and singer of Bèlè music
 La Perfecta : a band which played music including cadence and compas most active in the 1970s and 80's.
 Ronald Rubinel : author, composer, performer and producer of zouk.
 Dédé Saint Prix : singer and traditional musician playing chouval bwa
 Shy'm : French R'n'B singer and dancer
 Axel Tony : singer
 Lynnsha : singer, author, composer and performer of zouk
 Eddy Marc : zouk singer
 Stacy: zouk singer, nominee for Best New International Act at the BET Awards 2020.

Sports personalities

Athletics / Parathletics 
 Marie-José Pérec
 Coralie Balmy
 Ghislaine Barnay
 Mélanie de Jesus dos Santos
 Mandy François-Elie
 Max Morinière
 Hermann Panzo
 Ronald Pognon

Basketball 
 Marielle Amant
 Leslie Ardon
 Sandrine Gruda
 Ronny Turiaf

Football 
 Stéphane Abaul
 Fabrice Abriel
 Nicolas Anelka
 Johan Audel
 Jean-Sylvain Babin
 Mickaël Biron
 Garry Bocaly
 Patrick Burner
 Manuel Cabit
 Florian Chabrolle
 Daniel Charles-Alfred
 Paul Chillan
 Jérémie Porsan-Clémenté
 Gaël Clichy
 Charles-Édouard Coridon
 Mathias Coureur
 Sébastien Crétinoir
 Jordy Delem
 Didier Domi
 Julio Donisa
 Gaël Germany
 Joan Hartock
 Thierry Henry
 Christophe Hérelle
 Daniel Hérelle
 Steeven Langil
 Peter Luccin
 Kévin Parsemain
 Patrick Percin
 Frédéric Piquionne
 David Regis
 Loïc Rémy
 Wendie Renard
 Fabrice Reuperné
 Emmanuel Rivière
 Franck Tanasi
 Kévin Théophile-Catherine
 Raphaël Varane
 Sylvain Wiltord
 Axel Witsel
 Jonathan Zebina

Handball 
 Joël Abati
 Mathieu Grébille
 Cédric Sorhaindo

Judo 
 Amandine Buchard
 Kayra Sayit

Tennis 
 Gaël Monfils

Volleyball 
 Frantz Granvorka

Politics

Contemporary political figures 

 Maurice Antiste, Senator and former mayor of François
 David Zobda, Mayor of Lamentin, vice-president of CACEM and member of the Executive Council of Martinique
 Didier Laguerre, Mayor of Fort-de-France, CACEM and Councillor to the Assembly of Martinique
 Yann Monplaisir, Mayor of Saint-Joseph,1st vice-president of the Territorial Authorities of Martinique
 André Lesueur, Mayor of Rivière-Salée and former Conseiller régional of Martinique
 Serge Letchimy, President of the Executive Council of Martinique since 2021, member of the National Assembly of France representing the island of Martinique's 3rd constituency since June 2007
 Josette Manin, Member of Parliament for Martinique, Councillor to the Assembly of Martinique and former President of the General Council of Martinique
 Bruno Nestor Azerot, Mayor of Sainte-Marie, President of CAP Nord Martinique and Councillor to the Assembly of Martinique 
 Jean-Philippe Nilor, Deputy and Councillor to the Assembly of Martinique
 Luc-Louison Clémenté, Mayor of Schoelcher and President of the CACEM
 Justin Pamphile, Mayor of Le Lorrain, Councillor to the Assembly of Martinique, President of the Association of Mayors of Martinique
 Nicaise Monrose, Mayor of Sainte-Luce, vice-president of CAESM and member of the Executive Council of Martinique
 Arnaud René-Corail, Mayor of Les Trois-Ilets, vice-president of CAESM and member of the Executive Council of Martinique
 Marie-Thérèse Casimirius, Mayor of Basse-Pointe, First Vice-president of CAP Nord Martinique and member of the Executive Council of Martinique
 Manuéla Kéclard-Mondésir, Member of Parliament for Martinique
 Lucien Saliber, President of the Assembly of Martinique, 4th Vice President of CAP Nord Martinique, Municipal Councillor of Le Morne-Vert and former mayor of Le Morne-Vert
 Jenny Dulys-Petit, Mayor of Le Morne Rouge and Councillor to the Assembly of Martinique
 Audrey Pulvar, former journalist and politician, Deputy Mayor of Paris and Regional Councillor for Île-de-France, Member of the Standing Committee.
 Karine Jean-Pierre, political advisor, White House Press Secretary.
 Cédric Pemba-Marine was born in Hauts-de-Seine in France, of Martinican origin, and mayor of Le Port-Marly since 2020.

Politicians of Martinique 

 Pierre Aliker, doctor and mayor of Fort-de-France
 Josephine Buoneparte, born Marie Josèphe Rose Tascher de La Pagerie was Empress of the French and Queen consort of Italy
 Cyrille Bissette, deputy and one of the fathers of the abolition of slavery in Martinique
 Auguste-François Perrinon, Abolitionist Member of Parliament
 Pierre-Marie Pory-Papy, first black Martinician to become a lawyer, a mayor of Saint-Pierre and Abolitionist Member of Parliament
 Victor Mazuline, first black Martinican elected Member of Parliament
 Léopold Bissol, deputy and one of the founders of the communist movement in Martinique and the CGT Martinique union
 Aimé Césaire, Deputy Mayor of Fort-de-France and President of the Regional Council
 Camille Darsières, Member of Parliament and President of the Regional Council
 Louis Delgrès, known for the anti-Slavery proclamation signed with his name, dated 10 May 1802, and leading resistance on Guadeloupe to reoccupation and thus the reinstitution of slavery by Napoleonic France in 1802.
 Alcide Delmont, Under-Secretary of State for the Colonies of the nineteenth and nineteenth century, in the government of André Tardieu
 Ernest Deproge, Member of Parliament for Martinique (1882-1898), President of the General Council and a controversial figure of French colonization
 Osman Duquesnay, Mayor of Fort-de-France and Member of Parliament 
 François Duval, Senator from 1968 to 1977, Mayor of François and President of the General Council
 Georges Gratiant, Mayor of Lamentin and President of the General Council
 Marius Hurard, deputy and founder of the secular school in Martinique
 Joseph Lagrosillière, deputy and founder of the socialist movement in Martinique
 Pierre-Alexandre Le Camus, Count of Fürstenstein (born in Martinique in 1774, died in 1824 in Le Chesnay), Secretary of State and foreign minister to Kingdom of Westphalia.
 Henry Lémery, Justice Minister in the government of Gaston Doumergue, Martinician appointed minister in a French government.
 Émile Maurice, Mayor of Saint-Joseph and President of the General Council
 Camille Petit, deputy and founder of the Gaullist movement in Martinique
 Pierre Petit, Mayor of Le Morne-Rouge and Member of Parliament
 Marie-Joseph Pernock served in the National Assembly from 1966 to 1967.
 Michel Renard, Mayor of Marigot and Deputy
 Victor Sévère, Deputy Mayor of Fort-de-France
 Paul Symphor, President of the General Council 1947-1948 and Senator
 Victor Schœlcher (died 1893), deputy of Martinique, 1848-1849 and 1871–1875, known for having acted in favor of the definitive abolition of slavery in France, via the decree of abolition of 1848
 Emmanuel Véry-Hermence 1902–1966, member of the National Assembly

Martinican writers and intellectuals 

thumb|Édouard Glissant, novelist, poet, essayist and philosopher, he won the Prix Renaudot in 1958, the Prix Puterbaugh in the United States in 1989 and the Prix Roger Caillois in 1991. Edouard Glissant is the founder of the literary movement L'Antillanité and the philosophical concept "Le Tout Monde"

A non-exhaustive list of the main novelists, poets, playwrights, essayists, sociologists, economists and historians from Martinique:
 Jacques Adélaïde-Merlande : Historian. In 2000, he was awarded an honorary degree by the University of the West Indies. He is the author of "Histoire générale des Antilles et des Guyanes, des Précolombiens à nos jours" and directed the publication of volumes 3 and 4 of the "Historial antillais" series.
 Alfred Alexandre : a writer, he won the Prix des Amériques insulaires et de la Guyane in 2006 for his novel "Bord de canal". In 2020, he won the Prix Carbet de la Caraïbe et du Tout-Monde for his collection of poems "The walk of Leïla Khane".
 Sabine Andrivon-Milton : historian, founder of the Association for the Military History of Martinique and Chevalier de la Légion d'honneur, she is the author of "La Martinique pendant la Grande Guerre" a collection of poems and songs, and "Anatole dans la tourmente du Morne Siphon".
 Jean Bernabé : a writer, linguist and author of several novels including Le Bailleur d'étincelle and Le Partage des ancêtres
 Daniel Boukman : writer, he won the Carbet Prize in 1992, writing Et jusqu'à la dernière pulsation de nos veines, Délivrans, and Chants pour hâter la mort du temps des Orphées ou Madinina île esclave
 Roland Brival : writer, awarded the prix RFO du livre in 2000 and chevalier de l'ordre des Arts et des Lettres in 2013
 Guy Cabort-Masson : novelist, who won the Prix de la Fondation Frantz Fanon in 1998 for La Mangrove mulâtre, Martinique, comportements et mentalité
 Nicole Cage-Florentiny : novelist who won the prix Casa de las Américas 1996 (Cuba) for Arc-en-Ciel, l'espoir, also writing C'est vole que je vole and a bilingual collection of poems, Dèyè pawol sé lanmou / Par-delà les mots l'amour
 Mayotte Capécia : novelist born in Le Carbet in 1916, the author of two major novels "I Am a Martinican Woman" and "The White Negress". She won the France-Antilles prize for "Je suis martiniquaise" in 1949
 Marie-Magdeleine Carbet : a novelist, whose best-known work is a volume of poetry titled "Rose de ta grâce". She received the Prix littéraire des Caraïbes in 1970
 Paule Cassius de Linval, writer, storyteller and poet. In 1961, his collection of tales "Mon pays à travers les légendes" won the prix Montyon
 Aimé Césaire : poet and playwright and father of the concept of négritude, Cahier d'un retour au pays natal, Discourse on Colonialism, The Tragedy of King Christophe
 Suzanne Césaire : author of Léo Frobénius et le problème des civilisations and Aurore de la liberté
 Patrick Chamoiseau : novelist awarded the prix Goncourt in 1992 for Texaco, Chronique des sept misères, Une enfance créole 
 Nadia Chonville : Sociologist and novelist. She is the author of the fantasy novel "Rose de Wégastrie".
 Raphaël Confiant : novelist awarded the prix Antigone and the prix Novembre for his work Eau de café, Adèle et la Pacotilleuse, La Panse du chacal
 Jean Crusol : economist and author of Les Antilles Guyane et la Caraïbe : coopération et globalisation, Le tourisme et la Caraïbe and L'enjeu des petites Économies insulaires
 Camille Darsières : and author of : Des origines de la nation martiniquaise, Joseph Lagrosillière, socialiste colonial
 Marie-Reine de Jaham, novelist, made officer of the ordre des Arts et des Lettres in 2013, awarded the Prix littéraire des Caraïbes in 1997 and author of the best-selling novel "La Grande Béké"
 Édouard de Lépine : historian and essayist, Sur la Question dite du Statut de la Martinique, Questions sur l'histoire antillaise : trois essais sur l'abolition, l'assimilation, l'autonomie, Dix semaines qui ébranlèrent la Martinique : 
 Tony Delsham : a journalist and best selling novelist in the Antilles; he is author of Xavier : Le drame d'un émigré antillais, Papa, est-ce que je peux venir mourir à la maison? and "Tribunal des femmes bafouées".
 Georges Desportes : novelist, poet and essayist, the author of : Cette île qui est la nôtre, Sous l'œil fixe du soleil and Le Patrimoine martiniquais, souvenirs et réflexions.
 Suzanne Dracius : novelist awarded the prix de la Société des Poètes français Jacques Raphaël-Leygues in 2010 : Negzagonal et Moun le Sid, and in 2009 Prix Fetkann Maryse Condé in the poetry category for Exquise déréliction métisse
 Miguel Duplan, a writer and teacher, he won the Prix Carbet de la Caraïbe in 2007 for his novel "L'Acier". He is also the author of the following novels "Le Discours profane" and "Un long silence de Carnaval".
 Victor Duquesnay : Martinican poet. His best-known works are "Les Martiniquaises" and "Les Chansons des Isles".
 Jude Duranty : writer in French and Martinican Creole. He is the author of "Zouki ici danse", de "La fugue de Sopaltéba" and "Les contes de Layou".
 Frantz Fanon : essayist, author of Black Skin, White Masks and The Wretched of the Earth
 Georges Fitt-Duval : poet, author of the following collections of poems : "Salut ma patrie", "Floralies-florilèges" and "Environnement, tropiques rayonnants".
 Édouard Glissant : novelist awarded the prix Renaudot in 1958. He is the author of La Lézarde, La Case du commandeur. In 1992, Edouard Glissant was a finalist for the Nobel prize in Literature, but it was the St. Lucian poet and playwright Derek Walcott who won by one vote.
 Gilbert Gratiant : a pioneer of literature Martinican Creole, writing : Fab' Compè Zicaque, Poèmes en vers faux, Sel et Sargasses.
 Simonne Henry-Valmore : ethno-psychoanalyst and essayist. She won the prix Frantz Fanon in 1988 for "Dieu en exil". She co-wrote  "Aimé Césaire, le nègre inconsolé" with Roger Toumson in 1992, then "objet perdu" in 2013.
 Fabienne Kanor, novelist, awarded the Prix RFO du livre in 2007 for her novel "Humus". In 2014, she won the Prix Carbet De la Caraïbe for her novel "Faire l'aventure".
 Viktor Lazlo : novelist, singer and actor
 Étienne Léro : co-author of the literary journal Légitime défense and the journal Tropiques
 Yva Léro : novelist, Yva Léro authored "La Plaie", "Peau d'ébène" and "Doucherie".
 Georges-Henri Léotin : novelist in French and Martinician Creole. He is the author of "Memwè la tè", "Mango vèt", and "Bèlè li sid".
 Marie-Hélène Léotin, historian and executive advisor to the Territorial Collectivity of Martinique in charge of Heritage and Culture, she is the author of "Habiter le monde, Martinique 1946-2006" ;
 Térèz Léotin : writer in French and Martinican Creole. She is the author of the novels "Le génie de la mer", "La panthère" et "Un bonheur à crédit".
 André Lucrèce : sociologist and writer author of La pluie de Dieu, Civilisés et énergumènes, and Société et modernité
 J. Q. Louison : poet and author of the fantasy novel series Le Crocodile assassiné, Le Canari brisé and L'Ère du serpent.
 Marie-Thérèse Julien Lung-Fou : Martinican writer best known for her collections of "créole tales" published in three volumes in 1979: "Contes mes", "Contes diaboliques, fabliaux" and "Contes animaux, proverbes, titimes ou devinettes". She also wrote the essay entitled "Le Carnaval aux Antilles".
 Marcel Manville : essayist, and winner of the Frantz Fanon Prize in 1992 for his essay Les Antilles sans fard.
 René Maran : novelist awarded the prix Goncourt in 1921  for Batouala, Un homme pareil aux autres
 Georges Mauvois : novelist, playwright he won the Casa de las Américas Prize 2004 for Ovando ou Le magicien de Saint-Domingue, Agénor Cacoul, Man Chomil.
 Alfred Melon-Degras, writer, poet and academic. He is the author of"Le silence", "Battre le rappel" and "Avec des si, avec des mains".
 René Ménil, philosopher and essayist. In 1999, he received the Frantz Fanon Prize for his essay "Antilles déjà jadis".He was also co-founder in 1932 of the journal Légitime Défense and with Aimé Césaire of the cultural review Tropiques in 1941. He is the author of "Tracées : Identité, négritude, esthétique aux Antilles" and "Pour l'émancipation et l'identité du peuple martiniquais". René Ménil, and with Césaire, Fanon and Glissant is one of Martinique's greatest thinkers.
 Monchoachi : the pen name of André Pierre-Louis, a writer in French and Martinician Creole, he won the Carbet Prize and the prix Max-Jacob in 2003. His works include L'Espère-geste, Lakouzémi, Nostrom and Lémistè 
 Paulette Nardal : co-founder of the journal, La Revue du Monde Noir in 1932 and one of the inspirations of the négritude movement 
 Jeanne Nardal : Writer, philosopher and essayist, sister of Paulette Nardal
 Armand Nicolas : Martinican historian. He is the author of "Histoire de la Martinique", "La révolution antiesclavagiste de mai 1848 à La Martinique", and "L'Insurrection du Sud à la Martinique, septembre 1870".
 Gaël Octavia, writer, playwright
 Xavier Orville : novelist, who won the Frantz Fanon prize in 1993. He wrote Le Corps absent de Prosper Ventura, Le Parfum des belles de nuit.
 Gilbert Pago : historian and author of "1848 : Chronique de l'abolition de l'esclavage en Martinique", "L'insurrection de Martinique 1870-1871", and "Lumina Sophie dite Surprise (1848-1879) : insurgée et bagnarde".
 Roger Parsemain : Poet and novelist. He is the author of "L'œuvre des volcans", "l'absence du destin" and "Il chantait des boléros".
 Eric Pézo, Writer and novelist in French and Martinican Creole, author of the novels : "L'amour sinon rien"; in Martinician Creole, "lanmou épi sé tout", "Marie-Noire", and "Passeurs de rives" and "Lasotjè", a work of poetry.
 Daniel Picouly : writer, tv host and winner of the Prix Renaudot for L'Enfant Léopard
 Vincent Placoly : winner of the prix Frantz Fanon in 1991. Author of Une journée torride, La vie et la mort de Marcel Gonstran, L'eau-de-mort guildive
 Alain Rapon, novelist and storyteller. He is the author of the novel "La Présence de l'Absent" and received the Prix littéraire des Caraïbes in 1983. He is also the author of "Ti soleil", "Ti-Fène et la rivière qui chante", "Itinéraire d'un Esprit perdu" and "Danse, petit nègre danse".
 Clément Richer : Martinican novelist and author of "L'homme de la Caravelle". In 1941 and 1948 he was awarded the Prix Paul Flat by the Académie française for his novel "Le dernier voyage de Pembroke" and "La croisière de la Priscilla" and the Prix Marianne in 1939. His novel "Ti Coyo et son requin" has been translated into English, German, Spanish, Danish and Dutch and adapted for film by Italo Calvino as Tiko and the Shark.
 Jean-Marc Rosier : writer in French and Martinican Creole. He won the prix Sonny Rupaire for his novel in Creole, "An lavi chimérik" in 1999, then the prix Carbet de la Caraïbe for his novel "Noirs néons" in 2008 and in the poetry category of the prix Fetkann Maryse Condé for "Urbanîle" in 2015.
 Julienne Salvat : writer, poet, she is the author of Feuillesonge, La lettre d'Avignon
 Juliette Sméralda : sociologist, author of L'Indo-Antillais entre Noirs et Békés, Peau noire cheveu crépu, l'histoire d'une aliénation
 Daniel Thaly : Martinican poet, and librarian of the Schœlcher Library from 1939 to 1945.
 Raphaël Tardon : writer, author of "La Caldeira" and "Starkenfirst", which received the grand prix littéraire des Antilles in 1948. In 1967, Raphaël Tardon was posthumously awarded the Prix littéraire des Caraïbes in recognition of his life's work.
 Louis-Georges Tin : essayist and academic, the author of Esclavage et réparations : Comment faire face aux crimes de l'histoire and author of a dictionary that documents the history of the treatment of homosexuals in all regions of the world.
 Simone Yoyotte : She was the only woman to participate in producing the literary journal Légitime Défense published in 1932 by young Martinican intellectuals in Paris and considered one of the founding acts of the Négritude movement.
 Joseph Zobel : A novelist, and winner of the Frantz Fanon Prize in 1994. He is the author of : La Rue Cases-Nègres

Other personalities 
 Hippolyte Morestin, doctor, associate professor of anatomy and specialist in reconstructive surgery
 Raymond Garcin, neurologist, former member of Académie Nationale de Médecine
 Georges Le Breton, Doctor of Dental Surgery, former President of the Académie Nationale de Chirurgie dentaire
 Robert Attuly, Doctor of Law, Judge and former trial judge at the Court of Cassation
 Harry Roselmack, journalist
 Karine Baste, journalist
 Manon Tardon, fought with the French Resistance in the Second World War
 Jane Léro, communist and feminist activist and founder of the Union des Femmes de la Martinique (l'UFM; Union of Women of Martinique
 Soa de Muse, drag performer, finalist in first ever season of Drag Race France

Energy 
Martinique is part of the zones not interconnected to the continental metropolitan network (ZNI), which must therefore produce the electricity they consume themselves. For this reason, the ZNI have specific legislation on electricity production and distribution.

Martinique's energy mix is marked by a very strong importance of thermal energy production. At the same time, the island's electricity consumption has decreased slightly. These results can be attributed to the information and awareness-raising efforts of the regions, the Agency for the Environment and Energy Management (ADEME) and energy companies in favor of energy savings, but also to the context of demographic decline of the territory.

Despite these results, the control of the Territory's electricity consumption remains a central issue, given the Territory's low energy potential compared to other overseas territories, such as Guadeloupe and Reunion.

Martinique and its inhabitants are therefore faced with a twofold need: to further strengthen the control of electricity consumption and at the same time develop renewable energies to reduce environmental pollution due to thermal electricity production.

Renewable energies 
The exploitation of renewable energies in Martinique started late, as the characteristics of the island were previously considered unfavorable for their development. However, the efforts of the population and energy suppliers are moving towards a higher proportion of renewable energies in Martinique's future energy mix.

Article 56 of the Grenelle I Law No. 2009-967 3 August 2009, on the implementation of the Grenelle Environment Forum, sets out the provisions for overseas: in the case of Martinique, the energy objective is to reach 50% renewable energy in final consumption by 2020. Energy autonomy is planned for 2030.

As Martinique's electricity distribution grid is not interconnected with neighboring islands, let alone with the mainland's metropolitan grid, the decree of 23 April 2008, applies to the management of so-called intermittent energies: wind, photovoltaic and marine: any solar and wind power production facility with a capacity exceeding 3 kWp and not equipped with a storage system is liable to be disconnected from the grid by the grid manager once the threshold of 30% of random active power injected into the grid has been reached.

Thus, the achievement of the objectives of the Grenelle I law is subject to the development of Structures with a maximum power of 3 kWp or less, or to the incorporation of storage devices in production facilities.

Water 
90% of the water distributed by Martinique's drinking water network comes from Rainwater intakes in five catchment areas. Thus, although there is no shortage of water, the situation becomes very critical in the Lenten period, with abstractions leading to the drying up of several rivers.

Water resources are abundant but unevenly distributed: Four municipalities (Saint-Joseph, Gros-Morne, le Lorrain and Fort-de-France) provide 85% of Martinique's drinking water.

There is no water catchment in the south of the island. The water consumed in the South comes exclusively from abstractions from the North and the center (mainly from the Blanche River which flows into the Lézarde, the Capot, and the Dumauzé). Thus, 60% of the total is extracted from a single river (the Lézarde and its tributary, the Blanche river). This concentration of abstractions can constitute a risk in a crisis situation, such as a drought for example.

Health

Regional health agency 
A regional health agency for Martinique (Agence régionale de santé Martinique) was set up in 2010. It is responsible for applying French health policy in the territory, managing public health and health care regulations.

Healthcare professionals 
As of 1 January 2018, Martinique had a workforce of 1,091 doctors. For each 100,000 people of its population, there was a density of 141 general practitioners, 150 specialists, 53 dentists, 1,156 state certified nurses and 90 pharmacists. Self-employed doctors are represented by URML Martinique, created under the Hospital, patients, health, territories bill. URML Martinique works in partnership with ARS Martinique, l'Assurance Maladie, the Ministry of Health and Local Authorities to manage regional health policy.

Health facilities 
The University Hospital of Martinique (Le Centre Hospitalier Universitaire de Martinique) is a teaching hospital based in Fort-de-France, in an agreement with the University of the French Antilles. It is the largest French- and English-speaking university hospital in the Caribbean, having more than 1600 beds. These include 680 medical, 273 surgical and 100 obstetrics beds, with another 30 in its intensive care unit. The hospital operates a 24-hour emergency service.

Chlordecone controversy

Actions of the French government 
After the discovery of the toxicity of chlordecone, a dangerous insecticide, and the health risks it posed, the French state put in place certain measures to protect the Martinican and Guadeloupean populations, allocating nearly 100 million euros towards the implementation of these measures. The soils are regularly tested and subjected to strict regulations related to the standards of potability. Martinique is also subject to regular mapping processes to delineate highly contaminated areas. River fishing is also prohibited in order to limit health risks, as rivers represent high-risk contamination areas.

Since 2008, the French state has developed three action plans establishing strategies to protect local populations, raise awareness regarding the effects of chlordecone, as well as to support the agriculture and fisheries sectors.

A French parliamentary commission revealed in 2019 that more than 90% of Martinicans have been exposed to chlordecone, which was authorized for use between 1972 and 1993 in the banana plantations of the Antilles. The committee judged the three "Chlordecone Plans" launched by the State since 2008 to be inadequate; recommendations were provided via its rapporteur, Justine Benin MP, to address prevention and research into cleanup methods for a fourth plan, scheduled for 2020.

The parliamentary commission of inquiry called the French state into question for having authorized the sale of chlordecone as an insecticide, as its toxicity was known, but "responsibilities are shared with economic actors. Firstly, industrialists, but also groups of planters and certain elected officials."

Health consequences 
Chlordecone is known to have harmful effects on human health, with scientific research identifying it as an endocrine disruptor or hormonally-active chemical agent, as well as a probable carcinogen, particularly in relation to increasing chances of prostate cancer occurrence and recurrence. As an endocrine disruptor, chlordecone can also lead to delayed cognitive development in infants, an increased likelihood of pregnancy complications, and may disrupt the reproductive process.

The chlordecone molecule has physical and chemical characteristics that allow it to remain for several centuries in soil, river-water and groundwater, thus spreading beyond the location of the banana plantations where this insecticide was initially administered. Although chlordecone has not been used since the 1990s, the health risks remain. Chlordecone contamination occurs through contaminated food and drink.

Local community response 
In the streets of Fort-de-France, approximately 5,000 to 15,000 residents of Martinique demonstrated in protest on 27 March 2021, denouncing the possible statute of limitations on a complaint filed by civil parties for the use of chlordecone in causing life endangerment (mise en danger de la vie d'autrui). The complaint was issued on 23 February 2006.

The French government's actions in response to the historical authorization of chlordecone are often criticized by residents of Martinique and local associations involved in the "Chlordecone Scandal." The lack of information transmitted to the population concerning the danger of chlordecone between 1993 and 2004 is one of the main concerns expressed.

The civil complaint in 2006 was issued by several associations from the islands of Martinique and Guadeloupe, and was in response to the long-term impacts of government-authorized chlordecone use in polluting the islands' natural environments and affecting the health of inhabitants.

COVID-19 pandemic 

Martinique's first cases of coronavirus (COVID-19) were confirmed in March 2020. The pandemic has since put provision of health services under significant stress; as of 2 September 2021, Martinique had recorded an excess mortality at all ages, and of all causes since the week beginning 26 July 2021.

In popular culture
 In 1887, the artist Paul Gauguin lived in Martinique. Gauguin painted the tropical landscape and the native women. The Paul Gauguin Interpretation Centre (former Gauguin Museum) is dedicated to his stay on the island.
 In the lyrics of Irving Berlin's 1933 song Heat Wave, the dancer referred to by the title "came from the island of Martinique".
 Various films have been set or filmed on Martinique, notably To Have and Have Not, the 1999 remake of The Thomas Crown Affair,Concorde Affaire '79 and Sugar Cane Alley.
 Mexican writer Caridad Bravo Adams wrote Corazón salvaje (published in 1957), which was set in Martinique.
 Several novelists have use the island as a setting, such as Patrick Chamoiseau (Solibo Magnificent), Jean Rhys (Wide Sargasso Sea), Rex Bestle (Martinique Island) and Carolly Erickson (The Secret Life of Josephine: Napoleon's Bird of Paradise).
 Aimé Césaire's seminal poem Cahier d'un retour au pays natal (Notebook of a Return to the Native Land) envisions the poet's imagined journey back to his homeland Martinique to find it in a state of colossal poverty and psychological inferiority due to the French colonial presence.
 Lafcadio Hearn in 1890 published a travel book titled Two Years in the French West Indies, in which Martinique [Martinique Sketches] is its main topic; his descriptions of the island, people and history are lively observations of life before the Mont Pelée eruption in 1902 that would change the island forever. The Library of America republished his works in 2009 entitled Hearn: American Writings.
 The Island: Martinique by John Edgar Wideman is a travel memoir of an African originated man visiting "a place built on slavery" and a "deeply personal journal of his romance with a Frenchwoman" (2003, National Geographic Society).

See also
 2009 French Caribbean general strikes
 Bibliography of Martinique
 Index of Martinique-related articles
 Le Tour de Yoles Rondes de Martinique
 List of colonial and departmental heads of Martinique
 Regional Council of Martinique

References

Further reading
 Forster, Elborg, Robert Forster, and Pierre Dessailes – Sugar and Slavery, Family and Race: The Letters and Diaries of Pierre Dessailes, Planter in Martinique, 1808–1856.
 Gerstin, Julian and Dominique Cyrille – Martinique: Cane Fields and City Streets.
 Haigh, Sam – An Introduction to Caribbean Francophone Writing: Guadeloupe and Martinique.
 Heilprin, Angelo – Mont Pelee and the Tragedy of Martinique.
 Heilprin, Angelo – The Tower of Pelee. New Studies of the Great Volcano of Martinique.
 Kimber, Clarissa Therese – Martinique Revisited: The Changing Plant Geographies of a West Indian Island.
 Lamont, Rosette C. and Richard Miller – New French Language Plays: Martinique, Quebec, Ivory Coast, Belgium.
 Laguerre, Michel S. – Urban Poverty in the Caribbean: French Martinique as a Social Laboratory.
 Murray, David A. B. – Opacity: Gender, Sexuality, Race and the 'Problem' of Identity in Martinique.
 Slater, Mariam K. – The Caribbean Family: Legitimacy in Martinique.
 Tomich, Dale W. – Slavery in the Circuit of Sugar: Martinique and the World Economy, 1830–1848.
 Watts, David – The West Indies: Patterns of Development, Culture, and Environmental Change Since 1492.

External links
 Government
 Prefecture website 
 Collectivité Territoriale de Martinique website 

 General information
 

 Travel
 Martinique Tourism Authority – Official site
 Zananas Martinique – Informations site

 
Dependent territories in the Caribbean
France geography articles needing translation from French Wikipedia
French Caribbean
French Union
French-speaking countries and territories
Island countries
Islands of France
Islands of Martinique
Member states of the Organisation of Eastern Caribbean States
Outermost regions of the European Union
Overseas departments of France
Regions of France
Windward Islands